The Woodmen of the World Lodge—Phoenix Camp No. 32, also known as Heritage Museum of Orange, was a building in Orange, Texas. It was built in 1915 and served historically as a meeting hall and as a specialty store. It was listed on the National Register of Historic Places in 1996.

The building suffered damage during Hurricane Rita in 2005, but was repaired within a year.  It was again damaged in 2008 during Hurricane Ike.  The damage was determined to be irreparable, and was demolished in June 2010.

The building was delisted from the National Register in November 2010.

See also
 National Register of Historic Places listings in Orange County, Texas

References

Clubhouses on the National Register of Historic Places in Texas
Clubhouses in Texas
Buildings and structures completed in 1915
Buildings and structures in Orange County, Texas
Woodmen of the World buildings
Mission Revival architecture in Texas
Former National Register of Historic Places in Texas
National Register of Historic Places in Orange County, Texas
Orange, Texas
Demolished buildings and structures in Texas
Buildings and structures demolished in 2010